The Centro De Bachillerato Tecnologico Agropecuario No. 18, Gral. Cipriano Jaimes Hernandez (commonly called CBTA 18) is an upper-middle level agricultural education institution located in Ciudad Altamirano, Guerrero, Mexico. Founded on 1 October 1973 under the name Centro de Estudios Tecológicos Agropecuarios No. 18 (C.E.T.A 18), it is the first such institution created by the Dirección General de Educación Tecnológica Agropecuaria (D.G.E.T.A) in the state of Guerrero.

See also
 CBTA

External links
 CBTA 18 home page

Schools in Mexico